NCCERT (North Carolina Canine Emergency Response Team) is a Statewide volunteer organization providing search and rescue services to local, state and federal agencies. NCCERT is based out of the Raleigh area of North Carolina.

Location 
NCCERT Headquarters is located at  (35.673200, -78.931800) about 7 miles (13 km) southwest of Apex, North Carolina, on New Hill Road. This location also serves as Apex Fire Station #2.

About
NCCERT is a non-profit, 501(c)(3) corporation serving the State of North Carolina and surrounding areas. It specializes in finding missing persons.

Committed to the goal of providing highly skilled search and rescue teams 24 hours a day, NCCERT responds to requests from law enforcement agencies and emergency management agencies, during natural or man made disasters, structure and building collapse, drownings, and lost persons in urban and wilderness settings, at no cost to the requesting agency.

Through the Apex Fire Department, the group is a part of the search division on North Carolina Task Force 4.

In addition, NCCERT works to promote understanding and public awareness of the role of search dogs through public demonstrations and lectures to state and local agencies, schools, retirement and rest homes.

Trained in Disaster, Cadaver (water and land) and Wilderness searches, these teams undergo rigorous training and must meet strict standards before they are deployed on a mission. Ongoing training and continuing education is required for all members to maintain their skills at optimal levels.

Training in search and rescue and disaster response is conducted in diverse situations and often entails more than 50 hours per month for each member.

All members are responsible for providing their own personal equipment.

NCCERT is a statewide organization made up of local teams, which usually respond to local incidents for missing persons. Our calls range from swiftwater rescue calls during major disasters to an overnight search for an Alzheimer's patient. NCCERT is part of the North Carolina USAR Task Force 4 and acts as the search and communications element of that team.

Notable incident responses
NCCERT responded to the Apex chemical fire in October 2006 and provided a vital communications role for that incident. The Apex Emergency Communications Center had to be evacuated because of toxic fumes that were approaching their building.  The NCCERT communications truck housed the dispatchers and they were able to provide communications to emergency responders without incident during the duration of the event.

Functions
 Search & Rescue of lost or missing persons
 Major Disaster Response
 Request for Cadaver K9
 K9 live find searches
 Community Service Functions
 Emergency Radio Communications

Services
NCCERT services include:

Side Scan Sonar Operations (Underwater Cadaver, weapons etc.)
Wilderness search and rescue
Urban search and rescue
Collapsed structure search and rescue
Cadaver search

Awards
 2005 – Higgins & Langley Memorial Award (shared with other NC-based search and rescue groups)

References

External links
 

Rescue
Emergency services in the United States
Non-profit organizations based in North Carolina